'Youth with Talent - Generation Next' is a Sri Lankan reality talent contest which was aired on ITN (Independent Television Network) in 2016. The show brings together contestants between the ages of 15 and 35 to participate in a talent competition, which was hosted by Dilshan Pathirathna and directed by award-winning musical and tele-drama director, Mr. Sandaruwan Jayawickrama. Other contributors include Mr. Saman Athaudahetti, the chairman of ITN, and Mr. Eranda Weliange, the chairman of NYSC.

Auditions
Auditions were held throughout Sri Lanka and the best acts were selected to be telecast on television, along with other acts.

20 participants competed in each audition round and the judges selected 10 contestants for the next round.

Golden buzzer acts were sent directly to the grand finale.

Round 1
Round 1 was held from 09/09/2017 to 16/12/2017.

Round 2
Round 2 was held from 23/12/2017 to 27/01/2018.

Round 2 Summary

Round 2-1 Episode 16 (December 23, 2017) 
Guest Judge : Chandani Seneviratne

 Janith Dimuthu won "Talent of the Day" unanimously.
 At the beginning of the show, the host announced there were 11 contestants on the day.

Round 2-2 Episode 17 (December 30, 2017) 
Guest Judge : Rukshi Gamage

 Three sisters advanced with guest judge vote.
 Sentry won "Talent of the Day" unanimously.
 At the end of the show, the host announced 6 contestants were advanced among 12 contestants.

Round 2-3 Episode 18 (January 6, 2018) 
Guest Judge : Indika Upamali

 Advanced with guest judge vote.
 Nifan won "Talent of the Day" unanimously.
 At the end of the show the host announced 8 contestants advanced and 4 were rejected, but on air, 9 contestants advanced.

Round 2-4 Episode 19 (January 13, 2018) 
Guest Judge : Dannielle Kerkoven

 Advanced with guest judge vote.
 Heshan received 3 votes from judges and won "Talent of the Day", while Dammika receives a single vote from Kishu.
 At the end of the show, the host announced 9 contestants were advanced among 14 contestants.

Round 2-5 Episode 20 (January 20, 2018) 
Guest Judge : Sangeetha Weeraratne

 Chamara won "Talent of the Day" unanimously.
 At the end of the show, the host announced 6 contestants were advanced among 14 contestants.

Challenge Round Episode 21 (January 27, 2018) 
 This round consisted of 12 contestants who were not among the original 61527 applicants for the show. 
 At the beginning of the show, the host announced only 1 contestant will be selected to advance to the semifinals.
Guest Judge : Srimali Fonseka

 Eliminated with guest judge vote.
 Nadeesha, Chitraal and Umara voted to eliminate Thilindika from the pool. Chitraal and Nadeesha voted for Thusitha, while Umara and Kishu voted for Udaya to advance for the next round. Thusitha advanced to the next round and won "Talent of the Day", with guest judge vote.

Episode 22 (February 3, 2018) 
 Samare & Samare who were the runner up in Youth with Talent Season 1 featured in this episode.
 This episode was a recap of some of the quarterfinalists including Emil Tharanga, Nimesh Madhuwantha, Nishwahan, Wheel fighters, Three sisters, Subha, Janith Dimuthu, Praveen Melroy, Tharumaraja Thuwaragan, Janakajeewa, Dhammika Susantha Kumara and Chamara Thusitha Bandara and some sneak peek of the semifinals which begins on February 10, 2010.

Semi-finals
Semifinals will be started on February 10, 2018. There will be 38 contestants and only 6 will be selected by the judge panel. Each semifinals will consist of 19 contestants.
Results are based on judge decisions.

Semi Finals 1 Episode 23 (February 10, 2018) 

Guest Judge : TBA

Semi Finals 3 Episode 24 (February 18th 2018)

Guest Judge : TBA

Finals
Held on 3 March 2018
Guest Judge : Hemal Ranasinghe
The top 10 contestants participated in the competition including the golden buzzer acts.

Top three (3)

Top 42 Acts

Television in Sri Lanka